Clarence J. Monette (January 13, 1935, Lake Linden - October 30, 2012, Calumet) was a prolific author and historian from Michigan's Copper Country, writing extensively on Copper Country history. He has published more than sixty books and has written numerous outdoor survival guides.

Biography 
Clarence J. Monette was born on January 13, 1935, to a Peter and Isabelle (née Laverdiere) Monette in the village of Lake Linden, Houghton County, Michigan. Monette graduated from the Lake Linden-Hubbell High School in the year of 1953.

Monette is known to have served in the United States Army as a trained medical specialist and operating room and food specialist. He subsequently attended Suomi College in Hancock for a semester prior to transferring to the Michigan Technological University (MTU). He was an ROTC instructor at MTU from 1966 until his retirement in the year of 1988. Monette also conducted administrative and personnel work for the ROTC program. Throughout his lifetime, Monette wrote more than sixty Copper Country history books and a fair amount of outdoor survival guides.

Monette was an active member of quite a few groups inclusive of Post 90 of the American Legion, the Houghton County Historical Society, the Lake Linden Sportsman's Association, the Quincy Mine Hoist Association, the Keweenaw County Historical Society, the Copper Range Historical Society and the Isle Royale Natural History Association. Monette also served on the MTU Faculty Association. He was active with the Boy Scouts and served as a Scout Master for a number of years. In addition to the aforesaid, Monette was also a previous member of the Elks and the Lake LL-H Lions.

Selected works

Books 
 Cor-Ago, A Lake Linden Medicine Company
 A Copper Country Logger's Tale
 Gregoryville - The History of a Hamlet Located Across from Lake Linden, Michigan
 White City - The History of an Early Copper Country Recreation Area
 Some Copper Country Names and Places
 The History of Lake Linden, Michigan
 The History of Jacobsville and its Sandstone Quarries
 The History of Copper Harbor, Michigan
 The History of Eagle Harbor, Michigan
 Lake Linden's Yesterday - A Pictorial History, Volume I
 The History of Eagle River, Michigan
 Joseph Bosch and the Bosch Brewing Company
 Copper Falls - Just A Memory
 The Calumet Theatre
 Early Days in Mohawk, Michigan
 Lake Linden's Yesterday - A Pictorial History, Volume II
 The Keweenaw Waterway
 A Brief History of Ahmeek, Michigan
 All About Mandan, Michigan
 Hancock, Michigan, Remembered, Volume I
 The Settling of Copper City, Michigan
 Painesdale, Michigan - Old and New
 Some of the Best from C&H News - Views, Volume I
 Hancock, Michigan, Remembered - Churches of Hancock, Volume II
 Ojibway, Michigan, A Forgotten Village
 Laurium, Michigan's Early Days
 Delaware, Michigan, Its History
 Lake Linden's Living History - 1985
 Some of the Best from C&H News - Views, Volume II
 The Gay, Michigan, Story
 Early Red Jacket and Calumet in Pictures, Volume I
 Lake Linden's Disastrous Fire of 1887
 Phoenix, Michigan's Story
 Freda, Michigan, End of the Road
 Houghton in Pictures
 The Copper Range Railroad
 Lac La Belle
 Trimountain and its Copper Mines
 Early Red Jacket and Calumet in Pictures, Volume II
 Upper Peninsula's Wolverine
 Redridge and its Steel Dam
 The Mineral Range Railroad
 Winona and the King Philip Properties
 Atlantic Mine: Photographs from the Harold H. Heikkinen Collection
 Some of the Best from C&H News - Views, Volume III
 Allouez, New Allouez and Bumbletown
 Some Fatal Accidents in the Atlantic, Baltic, Champion, Trimountain and Winona Copper Mines
 Early South Range, Michigan, Volume I
 Central Mine: A Ghost Town
 Baltic, Michigan
 Keweenaw Central Railroad and the Crestview Resort
 Clifton and the Cliff Mine
 Dollar Bay, Michigan
 Houghton County's Streetcars and Electric Park

References

People from Houghton County, Michigan
American male writers
Finlandia University alumni
2012 deaths
1935 births